Kankan De Ohle is a 1971 Punjabi film directed by Omi Bedi, starring Ravinder Kapoor, Indira, Jeevan, Uma Dutt, Mumtaz Begum and others with the guest appearance of Dharmendra and Asha Parekh. Sapan Jagmohan is the music director and the playback singers include Mohammad Rafi, Asha Bhosle, Usha Timothy, Bhupinder and Balbir.

Synopsis 

Kankan De Ohle depicts a test of will and honesty of a person, Chaudhary, who takes on an identity of a bandit in order save the marriage of his friend's daughter, and is sent to jail. Taking him to be wrong, the villagers throw out his wife and son, Madan. Madan grows up without knowing his father and becomes the darling of the little village. He determined to free the villagers from an evil money-lender, Ramu Shah, and for this he seeks help from his friend Banta Singh.

Cast

Music 
All lyrics are by Naqsh Lyallpuri

1- opinioning song "Sora aake jind rul gai"-Krishna Kalle

2-Rabba Ve Teriyan Be Par Vaahian-
Mohammed Rafi

3-hambe Diye Dale Ni-
Mohammed Rafi

4-Dil Maithon Mangda-
Asha Bhosle

5-Niki Niki Gale Tusi Kyon Rus-Bhupinder Singh Asha Bhosle

6-Hai Ne Main Sadke-
Mohammed Rafi

7-Pehlan Te Bole Haas Haas Ke-S.Balbir

8-Kankan De Ohle,Ohle Nachdi Phire Morni-Mohammed Rafi,Usha Timothi,Chorus

References 

Indian black-and-white films
Punjabi-language Indian films
1970s Punjabi-language films